= How to Have Theory in an Epidemic =

1999 nonfiction book by Paula A. Treichler

How to Have Theory in an Epidemic: Cultural Chronicles of AIDS
- Author: Paula A. Treichler
- Language: English
- Publisher: Duke University Press
- Publication date: July 1999
- ISBN: 978-0-8223-2286-3

How to Have Theory in an Epidemic: Cultural Chronicles of AIDS is a non-fiction book about the AIDS crisis by Paula A. Treichler. It was published in 1999 by Duke University Press
